Malleostemon pustulatus is a plant species of the family Myrtaceae endemic to Western Australia.

It is found in a small area in the Mid West region of Western Australia near Northampton where it grows in sandy soils.

References

pustulatus
Flora of Western Australia
Plants described in 2016
Taxa named by Barbara Lynette Rye